Motijheel Government Boys' High School is a school located at Outer Circular Road, Motijheel, Dhaka, Bangladesh. It was established in 1957 as 'Motijheel Central Government High School'. Though the name has been changed later to the current name, even today the name Central Government remains popular. Students of the school like to call them 'Centralian'. The school campus is 7.5 acres with 2 big playgrounds.

Classes are held in two shifts: morning shift, from 7:15 am to 12 pm and day shift, from 12:30 pm to 5:30 pm. There are 2 faculties for secondary education: Science and Commerce. It does not have any Arts faculty.

In 2008 the government of Bangladesh declared it a provider of Higher Secondary Education. Classes of college are held from 8 am to 2 pm. There is a separate 6 storied building for holding college classes.

The school is regarded as one of the best schools in the locality. It frequently takes place in top ten schools in Dhaka Education Board by result of SSC examination.

In 2016 a short film named 'ইস্কুল' was made featuring the school.

History 

On 14 June 1957 the foundation of the school was laid by Huseyn Shaheed Suhrawardy, prime minister of the then Pakistan. The name of the school was 'Motijheel Central Government High School' then. Later the name was changed to the current name. But even today the name Central Government remains popular.

The school started with few students. Currently, the school has about 3500 students.

In 1995 The school was awarded as the Best Educational Institution of Bangladesh, by the Education Ministry of People's Republic of Bangladesh Government. And the Headmaster of that time Mr. Rashid Uddin Zahid was awarded as the Best Teacher.

In 2008 the government of Bangladesh declared it a provider of Higher Secondary Education. A new 6 storied building was made to hold college classes.

Uniform 
• White shirt with school monogram

• White pant with black belt

• White shoes

° Navy blue sweater in winter

Co-curricular activities

Central FC 

Motijheel Government Boys' High school has an excellent football club known as Central FC. Central FC has been the champion of inter-school football tournament for many times. The school often holds inter-school football tournament too.

Debating Club (MGBHSDC) 
Motijheel Government Boys' High School Debating Club (MGBHSDC) was founded in 1996. Every year they organize inter-school and inter-class debate competitions. In 2009 they started a children's debate. In 2010 they organized a Club debate (university and college) competition. On that time, MGBHSDC was the only school level club which organized a club debate in Bangladesh. In 2010 they organized the twelfth Inter-school, fourth Children, third Club debate competition and workshop, and 80 teams participated.

Motijheel Government Boys' High school has an English language club.

BNCC
Motijheel Government Boys' High school is a part of BNCC (Bangladesh National Cadet Corps).

Scouts
Motijheel Government Boys' High school is a part of Bangladesh Scouts. The school was awarded first position in singing at the 1974 Jamboree in Mouchak Gazipur. The troop leader was Zia (1977 batch). The song was written, composed and performed by Hanif Mohammad (1978 batch). Later, the song became popular in scouting. The song was performed live in the presence of Bongobondhu Sheikh Mujibur Rahman on his birthday on 17 March 1975 in Banga Bhaban. The performers were Hanif Mohammad, Abu Osman and Imtiaz Kabir. It was played as a documentary in cinema halls before the movies.

In 1989, two students; Munshi Anisul Islam, and Md. Ariful Islam received President's Scout award. In 2016 another scout, Sarowar Jahan Sady received the President's Scout Award National Evaluation Camp (C.N.484). At present the Unit leaders of MGBHSSG are A.K.M. Jahangir Hossain Mojumder, and the Senior Patron Leaders are Eyafee Al Hossain, Syed Inan Fattah, and Md.Abdulla Al Noman.

Red Crescent 
The school Red Crescent Unit helps people affected by floods and other natural calamities. They organize Basic First Aid workshops for the students of schools and colleges.

Cultural Club 
The school has a cultural club named সংশপ্তক (Shongshoptok). সংশপ্তক made a short film named  'ইস্কুল' (Ischool) in 2016 featuring the school. The short film recalls the memory of an ex-student of the school.

Gallery

References

Primary references 

 Barshiki'11(Proshun), Annual Literary Magazine; Published: 2011; Date of Collection: October 25, 2012.
 Barshiki'99, Annual Literary Magazine; Published: 1999; Date of Collection: January 14, 2012.
 Barshiki'97, Annual Literary Magazine; Published: 1997; Date of Collection: January 14, 2012.

Others

External links
 Official website

Educational institutions established in 1957
High schools in Bangladesh
Schools in Dhaka District
1957 establishments in East Pakistan